Xinqing is a district of the prefecture-level city of Yichun in Heilongjiang Province, China.

Notes and references 

County level divisions of Heilongjiang